Euphrosinia Kolyupanovskaya (1758–1855), was a Russian Empire courtier, Fool of Christ, hermit and Orthodox saint. Originally a lady-in-waiting to Empress Catherine the Great, she left the court to become a hermit. She was canonized a saint in 1988.

References

Sources 
 Суриков И. М. Жизнеописание подвижницы и прозорливицы блаженной старицы Евфросинии, Христа ради юродивой, княжны Вяземской, фрейлины императрицы Екатерины II. — Сергиев Посад, 1911. — 87 с.

1758 births
1855 deaths

Ladies-in-waiting from the Russian Empire
Russian Empire saints of the Eastern Orthodox Church